The Dancer of Jaipur is a 1920 German silent film directed by Georg Bluen and starring Fern Andra, Ernst Rückert and Paul Rehkopf.

Cast
 Fern Andra as Schlangentänzerin Saferndri Yelama
 Ernst Rückert as Inder Anguli
 Heinrich Lisson as Gaukler
 Rudolf Hilberg as Fürst von Dschiapur
 Paul Rehkopf
 Sven Holm

References

Bibliography
 Paolo Caneppele. Entscheidungen der Tiroler Filmzensur 1919-1920-1921: mit einem Index der in Tirol verbotenen Filme 1916–1922. Film Archiv Austria, 2002.

External links

1920 films
Films of the Weimar Republic
German silent feature films
German black-and-white films
Films set in India
Circus films
1920s dance films
1920s German films